The Copa do Brasil 2004 was the 16th staging of the Copa do Brasil. 

The competition started on February 4, 2004 and concluded on June 30, 2004 with the second leg of the final, held at the Estádio do Maracanã in Rio de Janeiro, in which Santo André lifted the trophy for the first time with a 2-0 victory over Flamengo.

Dauri, of 15 de Novembro, with 8 goals, was the competition's top goal scorer.

Format
The competition was played by 64 clubs in a knock-out format where all rounds were played over two legs and the away goals rule was used, but in the first two rounds if the away team won the first leg with an advantage of at least two goals, the second leg was not played and the club automatically qualified to the next round.

Competition stages

Notes

References
 Copa do Brasil 2004 at RSSSF

2004 domestic association football cups
2004
2004 in Brazilian football